The Intel 8088 ("eighty-eighty-eight", also called iAPX 88) microprocessor is a variant of the Intel 8086. Introduced on June 1, 1979, the 8088 has an eight-bit external data bus instead of the 16-bit bus of the 8086. The 16-bit registers and the one megabyte address range are unchanged, however. In fact, according to the Intel documentation, the 8086 and 8088 have the same execution unit (EU)—only the bus interface unit (BIU) is different. The original IBM PC is based on the 8088, as are its clones.

History and description

The 8088 was designed at Intel's laboratory in Haifa, Israel, as were a large number of Intel's processors.  The 8088 was targeted at economical systems by allowing the use of an eight-bit data path and eight-bit support and peripheral chips; complex circuit boards were still fairly cumbersome and expensive when it was released. The prefetch queue of the 8088 was shortened to four bytes, from the 8086's six bytes, and the prefetch algorithm was slightly modified to adapt to the narrower bus. These modifications of the basic 8086 design were one of the first jobs assigned to Intel's new design office and laboratory in Haifa.

Variants of the 8088 with more than 5 MHz maximal clock frequency include the 8088–2, which was fabricated using Intel's new enhanced nMOS process called HMOS and specified for a maximal frequency of 8 MHz. Later followed the 80C88, a fully static CHMOS design, which could operate with clock speeds from 0 to 8 MHz. There were also several other, more or less similar, variants from other manufacturers. For instance, the NEC V20 was a pin-compatible and slightly faster (at the same clock frequency) variant of the 8088, designed and manufactured by NEC. Successive NEC 8088 compatible processors would run at up to 16 MHz. In 1984, Commodore International signed a deal to manufacture the 8088 for use in a licensed Dynalogic Hyperion clone, in a move that was regarded as signaling a major new direction for the company.  The available CMOS version was outsourced to Oki Electronic Industry Co., Ltd.  When announced, the list price of the 8088 was US$124.80.  The plastic package version was introduced on July 1981 for USD $14.10 per 100 in quantities.  Intel second sourced this microprocessor to Fujitsu Limited.

Differences from the 8086
The 8088 is architecturally very similar to the 8086.  The main difference is that there are only eight data lines instead of the 8086's 16 lines.  All of the other pins of the device perform the same function as they do with the 8086 with two exceptions.  First, pin 34 is no longer  (this is the high-order byte select on the 8086—the 8088 does not have a high-order byte on its eight-bit data bus).  Instead it outputs a maximum mode status, .  Combined with the IO/ and DT/ signals, the bus cycles can be decoded (it generally indicates when a write operation or an interrupt is in progress).  The second change is the pin that signals whether a memory access or input/output access is being made has had it sense reversed.  The pin on the 8088 is IO/.  On the 8086 part it is /M.  The reason for the reversal is that it makes the 8088 compatible with the 8085.

Performance
Depending on the clock frequency, the number of memory wait states, as well as on the characteristics of the particular application program, the average performance for the Intel 8088 ranged approximately from 0.33 to 1 million instructions per second.

The speed of the execution unit (EU) and the bus of the 8086 CPU was well balanced; with a typical instruction mix, an 8086 could execute instructions out of the prefetch queue a good bit of the time.  Cutting down the bus to eight bits made it a serious bottleneck in the 8088.  With the speed of instruction fetch reduced by 50% in the 8088 as compared to the 8086, a sequence of fast instructions can quickly drain the four-byte prefetch queue.  When the queue is empty, instructions take as long to complete as they take to fetch.  Both the 8086 and 8088 take four clock cycles to complete a bus cycle; whereas for the 8086 this means four clocks to transfer two bytes, on the 8088 it is four clocks per byte.  Therefore, for example, a two-byte shift or rotate instruction, which takes the EU only two clock cycles to execute, actually takes eight clock cycles to complete if it is not in the prefetch queue.  A sequence of such fast instructions prevents the queue from being filled as fast as it is drained, and 
in general, because so many basic instructions execute in fewer than four clocks per instruction byte—including almost all the ALU and data-movement instructions on register operands and some of these on memory operands—it is practically impossible to avoid idling the EU in the 8088 at least  of the time while executing useful real-world programs, and it is not hard to idle it half the time.  In short, an 8088 typically runs about half as fast as 8086 clocked at the same rate, because of the bus bottleneck (the only major difference).

A side effect of the 8088 design, with the slow bus and the small prefetch queue, is that the speed of code execution can be very dependent on instruction order.  When programming the 8088, for CPU efficiency, it is vital to interleave long-running instructions with short ones whenever possible.  For example, a repeated string operation or a shift by three or more will take long enough to allow time for the 4-byte prefetch queue to completely fill.  If short instructions (i.e. ones totaling few bytes) are placed between slower instructions like these, the short ones can execute at full speed out of the queue.  If, on the other hand, the slow instructions are executed sequentially, back to back, then after the first of them the bus unit will be forced to idle because the queue will already be full, with the consequence that later more of the faster instructions will suffer fetch delays that might have been avoidable.  As some instructions, such as single-bit-position shifts and rotates, take literally 4 times as long to fetch as to execute, the overall effect can be a slowdown by a factor of two or more.  If those code segments are the bodies of loops, the difference in execution time may be very noticeable on the human timescale.

The 8088 is also (like the 8086) slow at accessing memory.  The same ALU that is used to execute arithmetic and logic instructions is also used to calculate effective addresses.  There is a separate adder for adding a shifted segment register to the offset address, but the offset EA itself is always calculated entirely in the main ALU.  Furthermore, the loose coupling of the EU and BIU (bus unit) inserts communication overhead between the units, and the four-clock period bus transfer cycle is not particularly streamlined.  Contrast this with the two-clock period bus cycle of the 6502 CPU and the 80286's three-clock period bus cycle with pipelining down to two cycles for most transfers.  Most 8088 instructions that can operate on either registers or memory, including common ALU and data-movement operations, are at least four times slower for memory operands than for only register operands.  Therefore, efficient 8088 (and 8086) programs avoid repeated access of memory operands when possible, loading operands from memory into registers to work with them there and storing back only the finished results.  The relatively large general register set of the 8088 compared to its contemporaries assists this strategy.  When there are not enough registers for all variables that are needed at once, saving registers by pushing them onto the stack and popping them back to restore them is the fastest way to use memory to augment the registers, as the stack PUSH and POP instructions are the fastest memory operations.  The same is probably not true on the 80286 and later; they have dedicated address ALUs and perform memory accesses much faster than the 8088 and 8086.

Finally, because calls, jumps, and interrupts reset the prefetch queue, and because loading the IP register requires communication between the EU and the BIU (since the IP register is in the BIU, not in the EU, where the general registers are), these operations are costly.  All jumps and calls take at least 15 clock cycles.  Any conditional jump requires four clock cycles if not taken, but if taken, it requires 16 cycles in addition to resetting the prefetch queue; therefore, conditional jumps should be arranged to be not taken most of the time, especially inside loops.  In some cases, a sequence of logic and movement operations is faster than a conditional jump that skips over one or two instructions to achieve the same result.

Intel datasheets for the 8086 and 8088 advertised the dedicated multiply and divide instructions (MUL, IMUL, DIV, and IDIV), but they are very slow, on the order of 100–200 clock cycles each.  Many simple multiplications by small constants (besides powers of 2, for which shifts can be used) can be done much faster using dedicated short subroutines.  The 80286 and 80386 each greatly increase the execution speed of these multiply and divide instructions.

Selection for use in the IBM PC

The original IBM PC is the most influential microcomputer to use the 8088. It has a clock frequency of 4.77 MHz (4/3 the NTSC colorburst frequency). Some of IBM's engineers and other employees wanted to use the IBM 801 processor, some preferred the new Motorola 68000, and others argued for a small and simple microprocessor, such as the MOS Technology 6502 or Zilog Z80, which are in earlier personal computers. However, IBM already had a history of using Intel chips in its products and had also acquired the rights to manufacture the 8086 family.

IBM chose the 8088 over the 8086 because Intel offered a better price for the former and could supply more units. Another factor was that the 8088 allowed the computer to be based on a modified 8085 design, as it could easily interface with most nMOS chips with 8-bit databuses. These were mature, and therefore economical, components. This included ICs originally intended for support and peripheral functions around the 8085 and similar processors (not exclusively Intel's), which were already well known by many engineers, further reducing cost.

The descendants of the 8088 include the 80188, 80186, 80286, 80386, 80486, and later software-compatible processors, including the Intel Core processors, which are popular today.

Gallery

Peripherals
 Intel 8282/8283: 8-bit latch
 Intel 8284: clock generator
 Intel 8286/8287: bidirectional 8-bit driver.  Both Intel I8286/I8287 (industrial grade) version were available for US$16.25 in quantities of 100.
 Intel 8288: bus controller
 Intel 8289: bus arbiter
 Intel 8087: Math Co-Processor

See also
x86 architecture
IBM Personal Computer
Motorola 68008
Maximum mode
Minimum mode
iAPX for the iAPX designation
Professional Graphics Controller
Transistor count

Notes

References

External links
chipdb.org - Intel datasheet for 8088
PCJS: Original IBM PC simulation that runs in your web browser

Computer-related introductions in 1979
80088
Israeli inventions
16-bit microprocessors

es:Intel 8086 y 8088#Pines del 8088